Iraqi Revolution may refer to:
The Iraqi Revolt
The Iraqi Intifada (1952)
The 14 July Revolution
The Ramadan Revolution
The 17 July Revolution
The 1991 Iraqi uprisings